Simone LeAmon (born 1971 in Melbourne, Australia) is an Australian designer, artist and curator. LeAmon is currently the inaugural Hugh D.T Williamson Curator of Contemporary Design and Architecture at the National Gallery of Victoria, Melbourne and an Adjunct Professor, Design and Social Context, RMIT University.

LeAmon was awarded the prestigious 2021 Women in Design Award for "her life-long passion and unwavering dedication to the design profession in Australia" and was the 2009 winner of the national Cicely and Colin Rigg Contemporary Design Award, National Gallery of Victoria for her Lepidoptera Chair design. In 2007, LeAmon was identified in the top 100 product designers in the world in the book &Fork: 100 Designers, 10 Curators, 10 Good Designs (Phaidon Press, 2007) and in The Bulletin Magazine's Smart 100: Australia’s Best and Brightest.

Career

Artist and designer 
LeAmon has co-founded two design studios, n+1 equals interdisciplinary studio (1998-2003) with Charles Anderson, and Simone LeAmon Design and Creative Strategy (2003-2015). Between 2013 and 2016, LeAmon also had a collaborative practice with architect Edmund Carter. LeAmon’s art and design practice has been applied to product and furniture design, interior design, contemporary jewellery, and speculative design.  

Well known design projects by Leamon include: the crescent design for the Australian Islamic Centre; Lighting products for Rakumba Lighting; Bespoke lift interiors for the Juilliard Group; Melbourne Arts Walk masterplan and design for Arts Centre Melbourne; and the popular Bowling Arm bangles.

Between 2007 and 2010, LeAmon was creative director for Australian manufacturer PLANEX, and was invited to present design concepts for international manufacturers Oluce and Dainese, Italy.  

LeAmon’s art and design work has been exhibited in solo and group exhibitions internationally, including: "Unexpected Pleasures", Design Museum London (2012); "Freestyle: New Australian Design for Living", Triennale di Milano (2008); "Anytime Soon", 1000 Eventi Milano (2005); "Quiet Collision", Viafarini Gallery Milano (2003); and "MOTO Showroom", Gertrude Contemporary Arts Spaces Melbourne (2003).

Curator, National Gallery of Victoria, Melbourne 
In 2013, LeAmon was guest curator and co-exhibition designer for the design component NGV’s groundbreaking exhibition "Melbourne Now: The Design Wall" installation, which featured 700 objects and 40 design projects by leading Melbourne product designers and manufacturers.

In 2015, LeAmon was appointed to the new Department of Contemporary Architecture and Design at the NGV.  The NGV department is the first of its kind for an art gallery in Australia and LeAmon has co-curated an extensive program of exhibitions and collecting of Australian and international contemporary design including the annual Melbourne Design Week.

LeAmon’s curatorial activities at the National Gallery of Victoria include: the "NGV Triennial" in 2017 and 2020; "Lucy McRae: Body Architect" (2019); "Black Bamboo: Contemporary Bamboo Furniture Design From Mer" (2019); "Designing Women" (2018); "Contemporary lei and body adornment from the Torres Straits" (2018); "Creating the Contemporary Chair" (2017); "Art of the Pacific" (2016); and "Rigg Design Prize" in 2015, 2018 and 2021.

In 2021, LeAmon was appointed curator of the inaugural Melbourne Design Fair organised by the National Gallery of Victoria in collaboration with the Melbourne Art Foundation.

Lecturer, RMIT University 
LeAmon is currently an Adjunct Professor in the College of Design and Social Context at RMIT University. She also supervised honours students and taught product design and design history in the Industrial Design Department from 2003 to 2015 at the RMIT School of Architecture and Design.

References

External links 

 Simone LeAmon personal website simoneleamon.com | Artist, Designer, Writer

1971 births
Living people
Academic staff of RMIT University
Australian women architects
Australian designers
Artists from Melbourne
Australian women curators
21st-century Australian women artists